Naked Stage / Goli oder is an international contemporary theatre festival, held annually in the last week of October in KUD France Prešeren, Ljubljana, Slovenia. Up until 2006, its focus has been the improvisational theatre. As of 2006, the festival is dedicated to improvisation in various fields of contemporary art. Naked Stage was designed and is organized by the most prominent Slovenian improv group, Narobov. Artistic directors of the Naked Stage are Maja Dekleva and Gregor Moder.

Goals 
The Naked Stage festival has two principal goals. It offers Slovenian and international audiences a profile of the most interesting progress in improvisational theatre. At the same time, it provides artists an opportunity to research new terrains in improvisational theatre through intense workshops. In the field of theatre, the festival is dedicated exclusively to longform improvisation, avoiding short games and formats. It is growing in is experimental extension, as premiers compose a noteworthy portion of all performances.

History

2005
Invited theatres and special guests: Teater Narobov (Slovenia), Quicksilver Productions (Belgium), Isar148 (Germany), Theater im Bahnhof (Austria), Impromptu Theatre (the Netherlands), and: Lee White (Canada), Tom Johnson (USA), Bronwynn Mertz-Penzinger (Australia/Austria), Leon Düvel (Germany)

2004
Invited theatres and special guests: Teater Narobov (Slovenia), Theater im Bahnhof (Austria), The Brody Theater (USA), Die Gorillas (Germany), Stockholms Improvisationsteater (Sweden), and: Yann Van den Branden (Belgium), Bronwyn Mertz (Australia/Austria), and young Slovenian actor Nejc Simšič

2003
Invited theatres: Improklub (Slovenia), Isar148 (Germany), Unexpected Productions (USA), Improvvisatione Teatrale Italiana (Italy), Theater im Bahnhof (Austria)

2002
Invited theatres and special guests: Improklub (Slovenia),  Gledališče Ane Monro (Slovenia), and: Jakob Schweighofer (Austria), Roland Trescher (Germany), Daniel Goldstein (USA), Henk Van der Steen (Netherlands), Albin Juhanović (B&H)

External links
Naked Stage, international festival of improvisational theatre

Festivals in Slovenia
Theatre festivals in Slovenia
Improvisational theatre
Theatre in Slovenia
Cultural events in Ljubljana
Trnovo District
Autumn events in Slovenia